James Settle (5 September 1875 – 1 June 1954) was an English professional footballer. A fast-paced inside or outside right, he could have chosen sprinting if he had not taken up football.

Settle played for Bolton Wanderers and Bury before joining Everton for a fee of £400 in 1899, with whom he won the FA Cup in 1906. Settle was the Football League First Division's leading goalscorer for the 1901–02 season with 18 goals, the lowest of the highest totals achieved in the English top-flight to date. In 1908 Settle was sold to Stockport County, his final club before retiring from football.

Settle represented England 6 times between 1899 and 1903, playing in the British Home Championship against the other Home Nations, scoring 6 times, including a hat-trick against Ireland in February 1899. Settle scored England's only goal in the match against Scotland in April 1902 which was expunged from the records and replayed as a result of the Ibrox disaster which occurred during the game. Settle's goal in this match is not included in his international record.

References

External links
Jimmy Settle at Stats section of Everton F.C. website

1875 births
1954 deaths
People from Millom
English footballers
England international footballers
Association football forwards
Bolton Wanderers F.C. players
Halliwell Rovers F.C. players
Bury F.C. players
Everton F.C. players
Stockport County F.C. players
English Football League players
English Football League representative players
First Division/Premier League top scorers
FA Cup Final players
Footballers from Cumbria